Prospect Avenue or Prospect is a north/south main street that runs in Kansas City, Missouri, from Lexington Avenue to 85th Street. It lies close to U.S. Route 71 from Swope Parkway to 75th Street. Many of the surrounding areas are blighted.

Businesses and organizations
 KIPP:KC Endeavor Academy is located at 18th and Prospect.
 Wendell Phillips Elementary School is located at 2400 Prospect.
 Kansas City Police Department - East Patrol is located at 2640 Prospect. 
 Morningstar Youth and Family Life Center is located at 27th and Prospect. 
 Nile Valley Aquaponics is located at 29th and Prospect.
 Lucile H. Bluford Library is located at 3050 Prospect.
 Linwood Shopping Center is located at 31st and Prsopect. It covers from 30th to Linwood. 
 Sun Fresh Market is located at 3110 Prospect.
 Aldi is located at 3830 Prospect.
 Brush Creek is located from Cleaver II Boulevard to Swope Parkway.
 Blue Hills Community Services is located at 5008 Prospect.
 Research Medical Center is located from 63rd Street to Meyer Boulevard.
 Kansas City Police Department - Metro Patrol is located at 7601 Prospect.

See also

 39th Street (Kansas City)
 Linwood Boulevard (Kansas City)
 Southwest Boulevard (Kansas City)
 The Paseo (Kansas City)

References

 Cardboard buildings, concrete dreams Residents along Prospect Avenue erect a sprawling model of the ideal neighborhood | The Kansas City Star.
 Prospect Avenue corridor effort begins | The Kansas City Star.

Streets in Kansas City, Missouri
Transportation in Kansas City, Missouri